The Kilnaruane Pillar Stone is a carved monolith and National Monument located in County Cork, Ireland.

Location
Kilnaruane Pillar Stone is located about 1.6 km (1 mile) southwest of Bantry, atop a drumlin, in a square enclosure in a field.

History
A monastery may have been founded here by Brendan in the 6th century AD.

The pillar was erected in the 8th or 9th century AD. The name may refer to "Church of the Romans", and a community which accepted the Roman dating of Easter, a major controversy in the early Middle Ages.

The monastic settlement on the site may have been destroyed by a Viking attack.

Description
The stone is a thin schist pillar 2.1 m tall.

On the northeast face:
Celtic knot
an orans (praying figure)
Greek cross
Saints Anthony the Great and Paul the Hermit meeting in the desert: both were important figures in Christian monasticism. A raven flies down from heaven with a loaf of bread to feed them

On the southwest face
Celtic knot
 Two pairs of sheep/goats with interlocked horns — this is now the symbol of the Sheep's Head peninsula
a currach boat with four oarsmen and one figure steering the rowers through a sea of crosses. This could be Brendan or Cessair.

Mortises on either side of the pillar were probably for attaching arms of the cross. Nearby are stone fragments, possibly a bullaun or the arms of the high cross.

References

National Monuments in County Cork
High crosses in the Republic of Ireland